Miller's Tavern, Virginia (often Millers Tavern) is a small community located on the border of Essex County and King and Queen County, Virginia, in the United States.

The community is located at the junction of U.S. Route 360 with Routes 620 and 684.

The ZIP code for the community is 23115.

Watt's Supermarket is a landmark in the community.

Woodlawn was listed on the National Register of Historic Places in 1980.

References

Unincorporated communities in Essex County, Virginia
Unincorporated communities in King and Queen County, Virginia